Prunus rufoides (syn. The fruits are eaten by masked palm civets (Paguma larvata) and the fruits, leaves and buds are eaten by gray snub-nosed monkeys (Rhinopithecus brelichi).

Description
It is shrub or tree, usually 5 to 10m tall. Its bark is brownishgray. The leaves have a 0.8 to 1.7mm petiole, and are elliptic to elliptic-obovate, from 6 to 14cm long and 2.5 to 4.5cm wide. The leaves are a darker green on the top surface, with the underside pilose, even villous on the veins. Typically the umbellate or subumbellate inflorescences have 2 to 6 flowers with white or pink petals. Each flower has 32–36 stamens. The fruit, a drupe, is red, 8 to 9mm.

Distribution
Diel's cherry is found in Anhui, Chongqing, Guangdong, Guangxi, Guizhou, Henan, Hubei, Hunan, Jiangsu, Jiangxi, and Sichuan provinces in China.

References

External links
 

dielsiana
Cherries
Endemic flora of China
Flora of South-Central China
Flora of Southeast China
Plants described in 1905